is a railway station on the Tobu Skytree Line in Adachi, Tokyo, Japan, operated by the private railway operator Tobu Railway.

Lines
Umejima Station is served by the Tobu Skytree Line, and is located 10.5 km from the line's Tokyo terminus at Asakusa. Only all-stations "Local" services stop at this station.

Station Layout
This station consists of an island platform serving two tracks. Express tracks are on the outside to allow trains to pass this station.

History
The station opened on 1 October 1924.

See also
 List of railway stations in Japan

References

Railway stations in Japan opened in 1924
Railway stations in Tokyo